João Carlos dos Santos Torres (born 18 May 1992), known as just João Carlos, is a Brazilian football right-back who plays for Altos.

Honours
Confiança
Campeonato Sergipano: 2014

References

External links
 João Carlos at playmakerstats.com (English version of ogol.com.br)
 

1992 births
Living people
Brazilian footballers
Clube Atlético do Porto players
Cruzeiro Esporte Clube players
Botafogo Futebol Clube (SP) players
Associação Desportiva Confiança players
Serra Talhada Futebol Clube players
Santa Cruz Futebol Clube players
Esporte Clube Cruzeiro players
Campinense Clube players
Brusque Futebol Clube players
Fluminense de Feira Futebol Clube players
FC Cascavel players
Maringá Futebol Clube players
Floresta Esporte Clube players
Campeonato Brasileiro Série B players
Campeonato Brasileiro Série D players
Association football midfielders